Vasilije Prodanović (born 24 November 1985) is a retired Serbian footballer.

Career
Born in Belgrade, he previously played with FK Jedinstvo Ub, FK Čukarički, FK Zemun, FK Bežanija, FK Jagodina on Serbia. He had spells abroad with Polonia Bytom in the Polish Ekstraklasa and KS Kastrioti in the Albanian Superliga.

Honours
Radnik Surdulica
Serbian First League: 2014–15

References

1985 births
Living people
Footballers from Belgrade
Serbian footballers
Serbian expatriate footballers
FK Jedinstvo Ub players
FK Čukarički players
FK Zemun players
FK Bežanija players
FK Jagodina players
FK Novi Pazar players
FK Radnik Surdulica players
FK Mačva Šabac players
Serbian SuperLiga players
Polonia Bytom players
Ekstraklasa players
KS Kastrioti players
Serbian expatriate sportspeople in Poland
Serbian expatriate sportspeople in Albania
Expatriate footballers in Poland
Expatriate footballers in Albania
Association football midfielders